John Browning (27 January 1915 – 14 August 1971) was a Scottish footballer who played as a wing half for Liverpool and Cowdenbeath. In his spell at Anfield he was unable to displace the long-serving Jimmy McDougall from his preferred position, making only 19 appearances across five seasons. He moved to Gillingham, but before playing for them his career was interrupted by the onset of World War II, during which he appeared for Dumbarton, Albion Rovers and Cowdenbeath, staying with the Fife club after the conflict ended.

His father of the same name was also a footballer, winning Scottish league titles with Celtic and also appearing for Dumbarton.

References

1915 births
1971 deaths
Scottish footballers
Liverpool F.C. players
Cowdenbeath F.C. players
English Football League players
Scottish Football League players
Association football wing halves
Gillingham F.C. players
Bridgeton Waverley F.C. players
People from Alexandria, West Dunbartonshire
Scottish Junior Football Association players
Dumbarton F.C. wartime guest players
Albion Rovers F.C. wartime guest players
Footballers from West Dunbartonshire